The St. Gallen–Winterthur railway line is a standard gauge railway line in the Swiss cantons of St. Gallen, Thurgau and Zürich and belongs to the Swiss Federal Railways (SBB). The 57.1 kilometre-long line was opened between 1855 and 1856 in four stages by the St. Gallen-Appenzell Railway (Sankt Gallisch-Appenzellische Eisenbahn, SGAE).

History

Construction and opening
 

The Canton of Thurgau initially refused to grant a concession for the line on its territory, as the route would not have favoured Thurgau. The Swiss Northeastern Railway (Die Schweizerische Nordostbahn) operated the competing Winterthur–Romanshorn railway through the Thurgau.
 
The Winterthur–Wil–Thur bridge section at Schwarzenbach was built by Julius Herz. The Winterthur–Wil section was opened on 14 October 1855. The journey time was 40 minutes.
 
The line between Wil and Flawil was hotly debated. The SGAE applied for a concession for the easily-built route south of Uzwil’s local hill, the Vogelsberg, from Schwarzenbach via the Bettenauer Weiher and Oberuzwil to Flawil. Commercial interests preferred a route north of the Vogelsberg so that Uzwil could have a station. So the line was built with a tight S-curve on the edge of the Vogelsberg, where Uzwil station was later built. As a result, this S-curve is today one of the slowest sections of the whole line and the tightest curve on a relatively high-speed line in Switzerland. The Wil–Flawil section was opened on 25 December 1855.
 
After the construction of the Glatt bridge at Egg between Flawil and Gossau was completed on 15 February 1856, the line reached Gossau and Winkeln. Finally, the line was extended to the town of  St. Gallen on 24 March 1856. For this purpose, an iron lattice bridge designed by Karl Etzel was built over the Sitter, the original Sitter Viaduct.

Further development 

A train coming from Winterthur derailed in Vonwil near St. Gallen on 31 December 1879. The two locomotives came to lie on the left and right of the railway track and the carriages were pushed into each other. The accident caused two deaths and several were injured, some seriously.
 
The route became part of the Swiss Federal Railways on 1 July 1902 when the national railways were nationalised. Starting in 1903, the SBB duplicated the line in stages and electrified it in 1927 at 15,000 Volt 16 ⅔ Hz. At the same time, the Algetshausen-Henau halt was opened and the Bühler industrial railway in Uzwil was handed over to the company.
 
The Winterthur Hegi halt was opened in December 2006 as part of the expansion of the Zürich S-Bahn. Algetshausen-Henau and Schwarzenbach stations were closed in 2013.

Operations
In long-distance traffic, the line is part of the West-East axis from St. Gallen to Geneva.  In regional traffic, the Rheintal-Express (REX) runs from Chur via St. Gallen to Wil. In local traffic, the line is served by line S 1 (St. Gallen–Wil), with additional services in the peak as line S 11 (St. Gallen–Wil), and line S 5 (St. Gallen–Gossau–Weinfelden) of the St. Gallen S-Bahn. The section west of Wil is served by line S 35 (Winterthur–Wil) of the Zürich S-Bahn.
 
The route is served by the following lines (2017/18):
 Long distance
  (Basel SBB – Aarau –) Zürich – St. Gallen – Memmingen/Kempten – Munich
  1 Geneva Airport – Bern – Zürich HB – St. Gallen
  5 Geneva Airport/Lausanne – Biel/Bienne – Zürich HB (– St. Gallen)
  37 Basel SBB – Aarau – Zürich HB – St. Gallen
 Regional
  Wil SG – St. Gallen – Sargans – Chur (Rheintal-Express)
  Winterthur – St. Gallen (night line)
 S-Bahn St. Gallen
  Wil – St. Gallen
  St. Gallen – Gossau – Weinfelden
 S-Bahn Zürich

References

Footnotes

Sources

External links 
 

Railway lines in Switzerland
Railway lines opened in 1855
1855 establishments in Switzerland
Swiss Federal Railways lines
15 kV AC railway electrification